Scoular, formally The Scoular Company, is a corporation based in Omaha, Nebraska dedicated to the buying, selling, storage, handling, and processing of grain, feed and food ingredients.  The company was founded in 1892 by George Scoular and was owned by the Scoular family until its purchase in 1967 by Omaha businessman Marshall Faith, who served as CEO for the next 23 years.  At the time of Faith's purchase Scoular had 10 employees and operated three grain elevators, but grew considerably over subsequent decades and is one of the largest grain storage and handling companies in North America. In 2021, Scoular ranked 16th on FoodTalks' Global Top 40 Plant Protein Companies list.

Scoular employs approximately one thousand people at 24 offices and 90 storage, handling, and processing facilities, mostly in the United States.  In 2017 Scoular reported $4.3 billion in sales and more than one billion bushels traded.

Minneapolis-based data analytics company DTN began as a subsidiary of Scoular in 1984, later separating into an independent company led by founder Roger Brodersen.

External links
Scoular
Scoular Nebraska

References

American companies established in 1892
Companies based in Omaha, Nebraska
Grain companies of the United States